Quima Jaume i Carbó  (1934–1993) was a Catalan Spanish poet. She was born in Cadaqués, Girona, Catalonia, and graduated from university with a degree in Catalan philology.

Quima Jaume i Carbó was influenced by fellow female poets Marta Pessarrodona and Rosa Leveroni, and the main theme of her poetry was love. Prominent in feminist and literary associations, she died in Barcelona. She was the author of Pels camins remolosos de la mar (1990) and the collection of verses, El temps passa a Cadaqués (Time Passes in Cadaqués) (1988).

References

Further reading 

 K. McNerney & C. Enriquez de Salamanca (eds.), Double Minorities of Spain : A Bio-Bibliographic Guide to Women Writers of the Catalan, Galician and Basque Countries, New York (1994)

1934 births
1993 deaths
Poets from Catalonia
20th-century Spanish poets